Moncayolle-Larrory-Mendibieu is a commune in the Pyrénées-Atlantiques department in south-western France.

It is located in the historical province of Soule. Moncayolle is famous for its ornate Comtoise clocks.

See also
Communes of the Pyrénées-Atlantiques department

References

External links

  MITIKILE-LARRORI-MENDIBILE in the Bernardo Estornés Lasa - Auñamendi Encyclopedia (Euskomedia Fundazioa)

Communes of Pyrénées-Atlantiques
Pyrénées-Atlantiques communes articles needing translation from French Wikipedia